Orobanche bulbosa is a species of plant known by the common name chaparral broomrape.

It is native to the chaparral of California and Baja California. It is a parasite growing attached to the roots of shrubs, usually chamise.

Description
Orobanche bulbosa arises from a thick root and a bulbous, twisted, scaly stem base, and grows erect to a maximum height near . As a parasite taking its nutrients from a host plant, it lacks leaves and chlorophyll. It is dark purple to nearly black in color, with tiny whitish bumps bearing hairs.

The inflorescence is a dense spike-like or pyramid-shaped cluster of generally over 20 flowers.

The fruit is a capsule containing minute seeds.

External links
Jepson Manual Treatment of Orobanche bulbosa
USDA Plants Profile for Orobanche bulbosa
Orobanche bulbosa — Photo gallery

bulbosa
Flora of Baja California
Flora of California
Flora of the Sierra Nevada (United States)
Natural history of the California chaparral and woodlands
Natural history of the California Coast Ranges
Natural history of the Channel Islands of California
Natural history of the Peninsular Ranges
Natural history of the San Francisco Bay Area
Natural history of the Santa Monica Mountains
Natural history of the Transverse Ranges
Least concern biota of Mexico